Colin Thibert is a Swiss writer and screenwriter for television. He was born in 1951 in Neuchâtel. In 2002, he received the SNCF Polar award for Royal Cambouis (Série Noire, Gallimard). His 2019 novel Torrentius, published by Editions Héloïse d'Ormesson, received the Roland de Jouvenel Prize awarded by the Académie française.

References

Swiss writers
1951 births
Living people
Date of birth missing (living people)